Smith was an American rock band, formed in Los Angeles, California in 1969. They had a blues-based sound and scored a Top 5 hit in the United States in 1969 with the Burt Bacharach song "Baby It's You", featuring Gayle McCormick on lead vocals. The record sold over one million copies between July and October 1969, out-charted popular versions by the Beatles and the Shirelles, and received a gold record awarded by the RIAA.

Beginnings
The group evolved from "The Smiths" (not to be confused with later English band The Smiths), which featured two of the same members, and had attempted a hit single with "Now I Taste The Tears", produced and arranged by Ron Budnik. "Tears" was a brooding, foreboding sounding record that didn't chart well. When the band did not succeed, McCormick, who had started her career singing songs by Tina Turner, Etta James and others, was added as a front woman and lead vocalist. The group were discovered by 1960s rocker Del Shannon in a nightclub in Los Angeles. Shannon arranged "Baby It's You" for the group and got them signed to the ABC-Dunhill label.

Career
Smith released an album titled A Group Called Smith, which spent 11 weeks in the Top 40 album listings of the since-called Billboard 200 record chart. On the album, vocals were split amongst Rich Cliburn, Jerry Carter and McCormick. Smith recorded a second album titled Minus-Plus with lesser success since it only reached #74. Smith's version of "The Weight" was included on the epochal Easy Rider soundtrack because, due to contractual reasons, The Band's version, which appeared in the movie, was unavailable. Most of their material consisted of re-recordings of popular rock and R&B tunes.

The band's singles "Take a Look Around" and "What Am I Gonna Do" reached the charts, but the group broke up after two albums. The band's hit "Baby It's You" was featured in Quentin Tarantino's Grindhouse film, Death Proof.

McCormick solo career
After Smith disbanded, McCormick went on to record three solo albums, Gayle McCormick in 1971, Flesh & Blood in 1972 and One More Hour in 1974. The single "It's A Cryin' Shame" from her eponymous first album was a minor hit for her, reaching #44 on the charts in 1971. It and "Gonna Be Alright Now" were included on the 1994 reissue of A Group Called Smith.

Discography

Albums
 A Group Called Smith - (1969)
  Minus-Plus - (1970)

Personnel
Smith was composed of one woman and four men:
Gayle McCormick – lead vocals
Larry Moss – organ
Jerry Carter – bass
Robert Evans – drums
John Horrigan - drums
Rich Cliburn – lead guitar
Alan Parker - guitar

References

External links
[ AllMusic biography]

Rock music groups from California
Musical groups established in 1969
Musical groups disestablished in 1971
Dunhill Records artists
Musical groups from Los Angeles